Louis Chua Kheng Wee (born 1987) is a Singaporean politician. A member of the opposition Workers' Party (WP), he has been the Member of Parliament (MP) representing the Rivervale division of Sengkang GRC.

Career 

Chua is an equity research analyst. Prior to starting his career, Chua obtained a double degree in accountancy and business at the Singapore Management University, he is certified as a Chartered Accountant in Singapore and ASEAN.

Politics 
Chua was fielded in 2020 Singaporean general election to contest in a four-member Workers' Party's team in Sengkang Group Representation Constituency (GRC) on Workers' Party's ticket against People's Action Party. Chua's running mates are Jamus Lim, Raeesah Khan, and He Ting Ru. On 11 July 2020, Chua and his team were declared to be elected to represent Sengkang GRC in the 14th Parliament of Singapore, garnering 52.13% of the valid votes.

He was elected as  the Workers’ Party Central Executive Committee as Media Team Deputy Head.

Personal life

Family 
Louis Chua has been married since 2017 and is a father of 2 boys. He welcomed the birth of his first son in September 2019. His second child was born in November 2021.

Education 

Louis Chua attended Townsville Primary School and Anderson Secondary School. After which, he attended Hwa Chong Institution.

References

External links
 Loius Chua on Parliament of Singapore

1987 births
Living people
Workers' Party (Singapore) politicians
Singapore Management University alumni
Members of the Parliament of Singapore